Daniil Apalkov (born January 1, 1992) is a Russian professional ice hockey player. He is currently playing with TH Unia Oświęcim in the  Polska Hokej Liga (PHL).

Playing career
During the 2010–11 KHL season, Apalkov played eight games with Metallurg Magnitogorsk in the KHL. During the 2013–14 season, on December 24, 2013, Apalkov was signed to a four-year contract extension to remain with Lokomotiv Yaroslavl.

Apalkov played eight seasons with Lokomotiv, and while in his final season under contract in 2019–20, he split the campaign between Yaroslavl and Dynamo Moscow. With the playoffs cancelled after completion of the first-round due to the COVID-19 pandemic, Apalkov left the club as a free agent.

On 15 May 2020, Apalkov joined his fourth KHL club, agreeing to a one-year contract with HC Sochi.

As a free agent from Sochi, Apalkov returned to original club, Metallurg Magnitogorsk, on a one-year deal on 8 August 2021.

Career statistics

Regular season and playoffs

International

References

External links

1992 births
Living people
HC Dynamo Moscow players
Lokomotiv Yaroslavl players
Metallurg Magnitogorsk players
Russian ice hockey centres
HC Sochi players
Stalnye Lisy players
TH Unia Oświęcim players
Yermak Angarsk players
People from Magnitogorsk
Sportspeople from Chelyabinsk Oblast